The German surname Hecht comes from house shields (cf. herald). In Yiddish der hekht means spear, arms. 
In modern German Der Hecht is the fish known in English as a pike.

Notable people with the surname include:

Politics and Law
 Burton Hecht (born 1927), New York politician and judge
 Chic Hecht, former U.S. Senator from Nevada and U.S. Ambassador to the Bahamas
 Daryl Hecht (1952–2019), American judge
 Evelyn Hecht-Galinski (born 1949), Jewish-German activist
 Greg Hecht, American politician
 Jon Hecht (born 1958), Massachusetts legislator, attorney and China law expert
 Michael Hecht, birth name of Michael Howard, British politician and leader of the Conservative Party from 2003 until 2005
 Nathan Hecht, American judge
 Sue Hecht, American politician

Academics
 Daniel Friedrich Hecht (1777–1833), German mathematician
 Eugene Hecht (born 1938), American physicist
 Friedrich Hecht (1903–1980), Austrian chemist and writer
 Frederick Hecht, American pediatrician, medical geneticist and teacher (descendant of Sam Hecht, Jr, co-founder of Hecht's)
 Michael Hecht, researcher in human communication
 Selig Hecht, American physiologist and atomic energy expositor
 Stefan Hecht, German chemist, professor at Humboldt University of Berlin
 Tobias Hecht, American anthropologist, ethnographer, and translator (descendant of Sam Hecht, Jr, co-founder of Hecht's)
 Robert Hecht-Nielsen, artificial intelligence and cognition theorist

Literature
 Anthony Hecht (1923–2004), American poet
 Daniel Hecht, American novelist
 Jennifer Michael Hecht (born 1965), American poet, historian, philosopher, and author

Entertainment
 Albie Hecht, former president of Spike TV and Nickelodeon
 Ben Hecht, prolific Hollywood screenwriter
 Erik Hecht, real name of German musician Eric Fish
 Gina Hecht (born 1953), American actress
 Harold Hecht, film producer
 Jessica Hecht, American actress
 Larry Hecht (1918-2008), better known as Larry Haines, American actor
 Paul Hecht, Canadian actor

Sports
 Duvall Hecht, American Olympic champion row
 Gerhard Hecht (1923-2005), German boxer
 Jeff Hecht, Canadian football player
 Jochen Hecht, German ice hockey player
 Ladislav Hecht (1909–2004), Czech-American professional tennis player
 Michael Hecht, German soccer player
 Raymond Hecht, German javelin-thrower

Business
 Ernest Hecht (1929–2018), British publisher
 Lotte Irene Hecht (1919-1983), German-Canadian entrepreneur, founder of "The 1945 Foundation", a Canadian charity organization
 Robert E. Hecht (1919–2012), American antiquities dealer
 Reuben Hecht (1909–1993), Israeli industrialist.
 Sam Hecht (born 1969), British industrial designer
 Sam Hecht, Jr., American retailer, co-founder of Hecht's

Other
 Abraham Hecht (1922–2013), American Orthodox rabbi, Rabbi Emeritus of Cong. Shaarei Zion (largest Syrian community besides Israel).
 Anton Hecht, English artist and filmmaker
 Erwin Hecht, O.M.I. (1933–2016), German Roman Catholic bishop
 Estelle Hecht, Canadian artist and gallery owner
 Hans-Joachim Hecht, German chess grandmaster
 Jacob J. Hecht (1924–1990), American rabbi
 John Rudolf Hecht (1911-1988), Austrian-Canadian entrepreneur and Austrian Honorary Consul in Kanada, founder of "The 1945 Foundation", a Canadian charity organization
 Joan Hecht, American writer and activist
 Józef Hecht (1891–1951), also known as Joseph Hecht, Polish printmaker and painter
 Kenneth Hecht, American public interest attorney, health and nutrition advocate (descendant of Sam Hecht, Jr., co-founder of Hecht's)
 Kenneth Hecht (disambiguation)
 Lina Frank Hecht (1848–1920), Boston philanthropist
 Mary Hecht (1931–2013), American-born Canadian sculptor
 Nathan Hecht (born 1949), Texas Supreme Court Justice
 Sigmund Hecht (1849–1925), Hungarian-born Reform rabbi in Montgomery, Alabama; Milwaukee, Wisconsin; Los Angeles, California.

Hechtman

 Gideon Gechtman (1942, Cairo - 2008), an Israeli artist, sculptor
 Ken Hechtman (born 1967), a Jewish Canadian freelance journalist

See also
 Lotte and John Hecht Memorial Foundation, a Canadian charitable foundation in Vancouver, founded 1962 as "The 1945 Foundation"
 Hecht Synagogue, Hebrew University, Jerusalem, Israel
 Reuben and Edith Hecht Museum, Haifa, Israel
 10484 Hecht, an asteroid

German-language surnames

cs:Hecht (rozcestník)
pl:Hecht (ujednoznacznienie)